At-grade may refer to:
At-grade intersection, a crossing between roads on the same level
 Road junction
Level crossing, where a road or path crosses a railway on the same level
 Diamond crossing, where two railway tracks cross
 At-grade railway, at level with the general surface

See also
Grade separation, the opposite of at-grade
Junction (rail), where rail routes meet or cross on the same level
Street running, where the train, tram or rapid transit run within the street